Ruth Erat (born 3 August 1951 in Herisau, Switzerland) is a Swiss teacher, author, painter, and politician.

Life

Erat grew up in Bern and Arbon and holds a degree from the University of Zurich. She obtained her PhD in 1985 after completing a thesis on Mechthild of Magdeburg. After completing her education, she began work as a teacher and as a district school superintendent at the teacher training college in Rorschach.

She has also worked as a painter and writer. In 1999 she participated in the Ingeborg Bachmann Competition in Klagenfurt.

Erat resides in Rheineck, where she also served from 1991 to 2001 as a council member. Her party affiliation was with the Social Democratic Party of Switzerland.

Ruth Erat is an author of narrative works and a member of the Association of Authors in Switzerland, the artists' professional association Visarte and the Swiss Werkbund. Visarte represents the interests of professional visual artists in Switzerland.

Works
 Do sprach dú ellende Sele, Zürich 1985
 Moosbrand, Suhrkamp Verlag, Frankfurt am Main 1999

Awards 

 1990 Workers' Literature Prize (Arbeiter Literaturpreis)
 1995 Recognition Price by Culture Departement St. Gallen
 2000 Book Award Canton Berne
 2021 Main Award Akademie für gesprochenes Wort, Stuttgart

References

This article was initially translated from the German Wikipedia.

1951 births
Living people
20th-century Swiss painters
21st-century Swiss painters
Swiss women painters
20th-century Swiss women artists
21st-century Swiss women artists